The Mountain View Cemetery is a  rural cemetery in Oakland, California, United States. It was established in 1863 by a group of East Bay pioneers under the California Rural Cemetery Act of 1859. The association they formed still operates the cemetery today. Mountain View was designed by Frederick Law Olmsted, the landscape architect who also designed New York City's Central Park and much of UC Berkeley and Stanford University.

Many of California's important historical figures, drawn by Olmsted's reputation, are buried here, and there are many grandiose crypts in tribute to the wealthy, especially along the ridge section with a view across the Bay to the San Francisco skyline, known as "Millionaires' Row". Because of this, and its beautiful setting, the cemetery is a tourist draw, and tours led by docents began in 1970.

Design

Olmsted's intent was to create a space that would express a harmony between humankind and the natural setting. In the view of 19th century English and American romantics, park-like cemeteries, such as Mountain View, represented the peace of nature, to which humanity's soul returns. Olmsted, drawing upon the concepts of American Transcendentalism, integrated Parisian grand monuments and broad avenues.

Adjoining Mountain View Cemetery is Saint Mary Cemetery and the Chapel of the Chimes mausoleum and columbarium.

Notable burials

There are many notable people interred in Mountain View; many are local figures in California history, but others have achieved wider fame.

Politicians and government officials

 Washington Bartlett, Mayor of San Francisco (1882–1884), Governor of California (1887)
 Coles Bashford, Governor of Wisconsin and Arizona Territory politician
 Leonard W. Buck, rancher, California State Senator.
 Warren B. English, US Representative (D) California
 John B. Felton, Mayor of Oakland (1869–70)
 William M. Gwin, one of California's first U.S. Senators
 Henry H. Haight, Governor of California (1867–71)
 William Knowland, U.S. Senator, Publisher, Oakland Tribune
 Adolphus Frederic St. Sure, Federal Judge
 Samuel Merritt, early Mayor of Oakland
 Romualdo Pacheco, Governor of California (1875)
 George Pardee, Governor of California (1903–1907)
 George C. Perkins, Governor of California (1880–1883); U.S. Senator (1893–1915).
 Richard P. Hammond, Speaker of the California State Assembly (January - May 1852) and former U.S. Army Major

Industrialists and business people

 Warren A. Bechtel, industrialist, founder of the Bechtel company
 Anthony Chabot, father of hydraulic mining and benefactor of Chabot Space & Science Center
 Charles Crocker, railroad magnate, banker
 William E. Dargie, Owner, Oakland Tribune
 J. A. Folger, founder of Folgers Coffee
 Peter Folger, American coffee heir, socialite
 Domingo Ghirardelli, namesake of the Ghirardelli Chocolate Company
 Henry J. Kaiser, father of modern American shipbuilding
 Ingemar Henry Lundquist, mechanical engineer, and inventor of over the wire balloon angioplasty
 Joe Shoong, Chinese immigrant and founder of the National Dollar Stores chain
 Francis Marion Smith, the "Borax King"
 Charles Miner Goodall, Co-Founder of the Pacific Coast Steamship Company
 Lewis Bradbury, a gold-mining millionaire who owned the Tajo Mine in Mexico, and later became a real estate developer

Military

 Brigadier General Henry Brevard Davidson of the Confederate States Army
 John Coffee Hays, Texas Ranger and first sheriff of San Francisco
 Eli L. Huggins, Indian Wars soldier and Medal of Honor recipient
 Henry T. Johns, American Civil War soldier and Medal of Honor recipient
 Oscar Fitzalan Long, Indian Wars soldier and Medal of Honor recipient
 Jeremiah C. Sullivan, Union Army general and staff member of Ulysses S. Grant
 Adam Weissel, United States Navy sailor and Medal of Honor recipient

Arts and culture
 Lucy Adeline Briggs Cole Rawson Peckinpah Smallman, botanical artist and plant collector.
 Leandro Campanari, Italian-American violinist, conductor, composer and music teacher.
 Herbert A. Collins, landscape and portrait artist
 Ina Coolbrith, California's first poet laureate
 Andre Hicks (aka Mac Dre), Bay Area rapper, record label owner, and producer
 Thomas Hill, artist
 William Keith, California landscape artist
 Bernard Maybeck, architect
 Julia Morgan, architect
 Frank Norris, author
 Floyd Salas, author
 Isabel Seal Stovel, organizers of the City of San Francisco Music Week
 Bella French Swisher (1837–1893), writer
 Douglas Tilden, sculptor

Local history
 David D. Colton, vice president of the Southern Pacific Railroad, namesake of the city of Colton, California
 Henry Durant, first president of the University of California, Berkeley
 Nannie S. Brown Kramer, organizer, president and membership director of the Oakland Women's City Club
Virginia Prentiss, African-American midwife and nanny to Jack London
 Jane K. Sather, donor of Sather Gate and Sather Tower to the University of California, Berkeley
 Francis K. Shattuck, prominent in the politics and early development of Alameda County, Oakland and Berkeley
 William T. Shorey, African-American whaling captain and Oakland civic leader
 John Swett, founder of the California Public School System
 Charles Lee Tilden, namesake of Tilden Regional Park

Other

 Volney V. Ashford, exiled revolutionary
 Cloe Annette Buckel, one of the first female doctors in California
 Glenn Burke, first openly gay player in Major League Baseball
 Henry D. Cogswell, dentist and temperance movement crusader
 Marcus Foster, first Black Superintendent of the Oakland Unified School District in Oakland, California, first victim of the Symbionese Liberation Army
 David Hewes, who provided the "Golden Spike"
 Bobby Hutton, first treasurer of the Black Panther Party
 Fred Korematsu, challenged Executive Order 9066 in the landmark Supreme Court case Korematsu v. United States
 Ike Lassiter, football player
 Joseph LeConte, co-founder of the Sierra Club
 Ernie Lombardi, Hall of Fame Major League Baseball player
 John Norton Pomeroy, law professor at Hastings College of the Law
 Elizabeth Short, unsolved Hollywood murder victim known as the Black Dahlia
 There is one British Commonwealth war grave, of Pilot Officer James Raymond Lippi, an American born member of the Royal Canadian Air Force, who died in 1942. Lippi was born in Santa Cruz, California and went to Canada to enlist for World War II
 Lee Ya-Ching, China's First Lady of Flight, first female pilot graduated from Geneve-Cointrin (Switzerland) and from Boeing School of Aeronautics.
 Zedekiah Johnson Purnell (1813–1882), was an African-American activist, and businessman

In popular culture
Mountain View Cemetery is featured prominently in the 2018 film Blindspotting. Daveed Diggs's character is shown going there for morning runs, and an important scene happens in the cemetery where the character imagines Black victims of police brutality standing over the graves.

In The Big Wake-Up, a 2009 crime novel by Mark Coggins, the main character in the book, a detective named August Riordan, discovers that Argentine first lady Eva Perón is not at rest in the Duarte family tomb in La Recoleta Cemetery, Buenos Aires, but is actually buried in Mountain View Cemetery.

References

External links

 Mountain View Cemetery web site
 Chapel of the Chimes
  Biographies of people buried at Mountain View Cemetery by Michael Colbruno
 

Cemeteries in Alameda County, California
 01
Geography of Oakland, California
History of Alameda County, California
History of the San Francisco Bay Area
Commonwealth War Graves Commission cemeteries in the United States
Landmarks in the San Francisco Bay Area
19th century in Oakland, California
1863 establishments in California
Rural cemeteries
Tourist attractions in Oakland, California